The 1922 Trinity Blue Devils football team was an American football team that represented Trinity College (later renamed Duke University) as an independent during the 1922 college football season. In its first and only season under head coach Herman Steiner, the team compiled a 7–2–1 record and outscored opponents by a total of 156 to 57. Tom Neal was the team captain. According to the university, this was the first season in which the team was called the Blue Devils (having been previously known unofficially as the Blue and White). The name was introduced by The Trinity Chronicle, the school's student newspaper, and slowly gained acceptance over the following years.

Schedule

References

Trinity
Duke Blue Devils football seasons
Trinity Blue and White football